Doctor Tomorrow is a fictional superhero appearing in books published by the American publisher Valiant Comics. The character was created by Mark Waid and Brian Augustyn.

Fictional character biography (Acclaim Comics)

When Bart Simms discovered a capsule from the future that contained a fully-loaded Angel Computer, he used the knowledge contained therein to become the hero known as Doctor Tomorrow.

Though initially Bart enjoyed playing the role of hero, eventually the gift from the future became a curse. From then on, Bart strived to stop the capsule from going back in time in an effort to change his own destiny, unaware that he was playing a role in someone else's plan.

Fictional character biography (Valiant Entertainment)
TBA

External links
Gallery of Doctor Tomorrow cover art
Bart Simms (Doctor Tomorrow) at Valiant Entertainment

1997 comics debuts
Valiant Comics titles
Valiant Comics superheroes